The 1985 Central American and Caribbean Championships in Athletics were held at the Thomas Robinson Stadium in Nassau, Bahamas between 25–27 July.

Medal summary

Men's events

Women's events

Medal table

See also
1985 in athletics (track and field)

External links
Men Results – GBR Athletics
Women Results – GBR Athletics

Central American and Caribbean Championships in Athletics
Central American and Caribbean Championships
Sport in Nassau, Bahamas
Central American
International athletics competitions hosted by the Bahamas
20th century in Nassau, Bahamas